The United States House Natural Resources Subcommittee on Energy and Mineral Resources is one of the five subcommittees within the  House Natural Resources Committee

Jurisdiction
All measures and matters concerning the U.S. Geological Survey, except for the activities and programs of the Water Resources Division or its successor.
All measures and matters affecting geothermal resources.
Conservation of United States uranium supply.
Mining interests generally, including all matters involving mining regulation and enforcement, including the reclamation of mined lands, the environmental effects of mining, and the management of mineral receipts, mineral land laws and claims, long-range mineral programs and deep seabed mining.
Mining schools, experimental stations and long-range mineral programs.
Mineral resources on public lands.
Conservation and development of oil and gas resources of the Outer Continental Shelf.
Petroleum conservation on the public lands and conservation of the radium supply in the United States.
Measures and matters concerning the transportation of natural gas from or within Alaska and disposition of oil transported by the trans-Alaska oil pipeline.
Rights of way over public lands for underground energy-related transportation.
Cooperative efforts to encourage, enhance and improve international programs for the protection of the environment and the conservation of natural resources otherwise within the jurisdiction of the Subcommittee.
General and continuing oversight and investigative authority over activities, policies and programs within the jurisdiction of the Subcommittee.
Coastal zone management.
General and continuing oversight and investigative authority over activities policies and programs within the jurisdiction of the Subcommittee.

Members, 117th Congress

Historical membership rosters

115th Congress

116th Congress

External links
 Subcommittee page

Natural Resources Energy